Shujalpur railway station is a small railway station in Shajapur district, Madhya Pradesh. Its code is SJP. It serves Shujalpur city. The station consists of three platforms. The platforms are well sheltered and have many facilities, including water.

References

Railway stations in Shajapur district
Ratlam railway division